Viefers is a surname. Notable people with this name include:

Susanne Viefers (born 1970), German-Norwegian physicist
Ulrich Viefers (born 1972), German rower